Gymnosporia nemorosa is a spiny, somewhat sprawling evergreen shrub or small tree with drooping branches growing to some 5 m tall and found along forest edges in Mpumalanga, Eswatini, KwaZulu-Natal south to the Garden Route in the Southern Cape. In Maputaland the species adopts the form of a geoxylic suffrutex or ‘underground’ tree, with shoots sprouting from its woody, underground axis.

Its fragrant white, unisexual flower clusters grow in the axils of leaves on lateral shoots resembling spines. Dusky-pink, pear-shaped, pendulous fruits are about 15mm in length and the same in diameter, dehiscing along three longitudinal lines to produce 3 valves curling back from the distal end to reveal orange arils enclosing the seeds. Leaves are alternate or tufted, hairless, leathery, 25-50mm long, with slightly serrate margins, ovate to round in shape, glossy and dark green above, paler beneath, emarginate to acute, depressed apex. Branchlets are spiny and densely spotted with pale lenticels. Larvae of the African moth Drepanogynis cambogiaria (Guenée, 1858) feed on this species and on other members of the Celastraceae. This is one of the species frequently browsed by Black Rhino in the Hluhluwe–iMfolozi Park.

Phytochemicals
Galactitol, β-amyrin, Lupeol derivatives, Friedelin derivatives, Tingenone, 20-hydroxy-20-epi-tingenone

Etymology
Nemus -oris = grove. cf. 'nemoral' = 'pertaining to a wood or grove' and Nemoralia

External links
Gallery at iSpot

Gallery

References

nemorosa
Geoxyles